= Peuo Tuy =

- Born: Peuo Tuy; Cambodia
- Writing career
- Genre: Poetry Spoken Word

Peuo Tuy is a spoken word poet, creative workshop instructor, and community organizer. Her poetry collection, Khmer Girl (2014), is inspired by the traumas of her life, including her family escaping the killing fields of their native Cambodia and enduring the inequities of life as immigrants in the United States. Peuo is one of the founding members and the Executive Director of the new Cambodian American Literary Arts Association, a non-profit literary arts association dedicated to the cultivation, visibility, and freedom of expression of emerging and established writers in the Cambodian diaspora.

Her work has appeared in Art Papers (2016) and WHYY (2017), a Philadelphia news media. She has also been featured in video projects such as The New School’s "Futurographies: Cambodia-USA-France (2016), Northern Monday Films (2017), Urbintel (2005), and 30ToLifeProductions (2016).

Peuo Tuy has appeared at Harvard Law School, Massachusetts State House, The Big Read/Miami Book Fair, the 2017 Minnesota Fringe Festival, New York Foundation for the Arts, Nuyorican Poets Cafe, St. Cloud University, University of Minnesota, Patrick’s Cabaret, Bowery Poetry Club, Harlem Book Fair, and Minnesota Cambodian Communities Council, as well as various junior high schools and high schools in the east coast. She recently announced her forthcoming book of poetry entitled, Neon Light Brights
